Vitalization may refer to:

Vitalization, a 2007 album by Vital Information
Vitalization (song), a 2013 Japanese-language song by Nana Mizuki

See also